Yle Vega (prior to 1 September 2016 – Yle Radio Vega) is a Finnish radio channel broadcasting in the Swedish language. It is operated by Finland's national public service broadcaster Yle (known in Swedish as Rundradion), which has its headquarters in Helsinki.

The channel provides a wide-ranging service containing both speech and music-based programming. It aims to keep Finland-Swedes informed about the society they live in – with news coverage and discussion of events not only in Swedish-speaking Finland and its localities but also in Finland as a whole as well as the wider world – while, musically, it pays particular attention to Swedish-language songs produced and performed in Finland.

Regional stations
There are five Radio Vega regions, each of which provides distinctive programming for its own area at certain times of the day. These regions are:
Vega Huvudstadsregionen: Finnish Capital Region, based in Helsinki/Helsingfors and also available in other parts of Finland
Vega Västnyland: Western Nylandia, based in Raseborg/Raasepori
Vega Östnyland: Eastern Nylandia, based in Porvoo/Borgå
Vega Österbotten: Ostrobothnia, based in Vaasa/Vasa
Vega Åboland: Southwest Finland and Åland, based in Turku/Åbo - Radio Vega's remit does not include coverage of events on Åland, since broadcasting there is a reserved matter for the autonomous provincial government in Mariehamn. Åland has its own public service radio and television service, Ålands radio och tv.

External links
Yle Vega - Official site (Swedish)

Yle radio stations
Radio stations established in 1990
Mass media in Helsinki